Lobelville is a city in Perry County, Tennessee, United States that was established as a trading post on the Buffalo River in 1854. The population was 897 at the 2010 census.

History 
Lobelville was established in 1854 by French trader Henri de Lobel. Originally known as Lobelsville, Lobel established a trading post on the Buffalo River in the early 19th century expecting that it would become a trading route. The proximity of the Tennessee River made this an unprofitable venture, and it never took off as a major trading point.

Geography
Lobelville is located at  (35.751119, -87.793085).

Lobelville now is the site of a major transfer point on the Tennessee Gas Pipeline Company pipeline network, which is also the oldest continuously operating business in the town, beginning operations in 1943. State Route 438 also passes through the southern part of Lobelville.

Demographics

2020 census

As of the 2020 United States census, there were 919 people, 461 households, and 290 families residing in the city.

2000 census
As of the census of 2000, there were 915 people, 400 households, and 261 families residing in the city. The population density was 232.5 people per square mile (89.7/km2). There were 464 housing units at an average density of 117.9 per square mile (45.5/km2). The racial makeup of the city was 97.70% White, 0.22% African American, 0.33% Native American, 0.22% Asian, 0.55% from other races, and 0.98% from two or more races. Hispanic or Latino of any race were 0.55% of the population.

There were 400 households, out of which 30.0% had children under the age of 18 living with them, 48.5% were married couples living together, 12.5% had a female householder with no husband present, and 34.8% were non-families. 31.8% of all households were made up of individuals, and 17.0% had someone living alone who was 65 years of age or older. The average household size was 2.29 and the average family size was 2.87.

In the city, the population was spread out, with 24.7% under the age of 18, 5.5% from 18 to 24, 27.5% from 25 to 44, 25.7% from 45 to 64, and 16.6% who were 65 years of age or older. The median age was 39 years. For every 100 females, there were 90.6 males. For every 100 females age 18 and over, there were 84.7 males.

The median income for a household in the city was $26,193, and the median income for a family was $31,389. Males had a median income of $28,750 versus $21,683 for females. The per capita income for the city was $15,549. About 14.3% of families and 19.8% of the population were below the poverty line, including 20.6% of those under age 18 and 12.6% of those age 65 or over.

Commerce and recreation 

The Buffalo River provides a substantial income of tourism through canoeing and fishing, as does the larger Tennessee River. Mousetail Landing State Park is situated south-west of Lobelville in Perry County along the Tennessee River. The Buffalo River Country Club is a local 9-hole semi-private golf course. Hunting, fishing, and camping (both at prepared sites and back-country) are widely available in the area.

Plain community 
There is a Plain, Old Order community at Cane Creek, Lobelville, called "Believers in Christ" that is different from other Old Order Mennonite and Amish communities in being rather intentional than traditional. It is in some way similar to communities like the "Christian Communities" of Elmo Stoll, the Caneyville Christian Community and the Noah Hoover Mennonites.

References

External links

City of Lobelville official website
Perry County official website

Cities in Tennessee
Cities in Perry County, Tennessee